Elgaard is a Danish surname. Notable people with the surname include:
 Casper Elgaard (born 1978), Danish auto racing driver
 (1879–1963), Danish farmer
 Ray Elgaard (born 1959), Canadian Football League player

Danish-language surnames